Anabarilius maculatus is a species of cyprinid fish in the family Xenocyprididae. It is endemic to the Nan Pan Jiang basin in Yunnan, southern China. It is threatened by invasive non-native species, domestic and urban waste water, agricultural pollution and dams. The species have not been studied well, therefore its ranked as Data Deficient. It grows to  standard length.

References

maculatus
Cyprinid fish of Asia
Freshwater fish of China
Endemic fauna of Yunnan
Fish described in 1980